Castle Point is a local government district with borough status in south Essex,  east of central London. The borough comprises the towns and villages of Canvey Island, Hadleigh, South Benfleet, and Thundersley. The borough council is situated at Thundersley.

The national land use tables published by MHCLG show that in 2017, the 56.6% of the borough was covered by green spaces including agriculture, forest and open land, water and outdoor recreation spaces. Close to one-fifth (18.2%) was accounted for by residential gardens.  The district relies heavily on other parts of Essex including factories and ports in Tilbury, the city of Southend-on-Sea and on Central London for its largest sources of employment and as it has areas of seaside resort the median age of residents was in 2011 greater than the national average: 7% of its residents were aged 75 to 84 compared with 5.5% nationally.

History
The district was formed on 1 April 1974 by the merger of Benfleet and Canvey Island Urban Districts. Its name contains references to the principal landmarks of the combined urban districts: Hadleigh Castle and Canvey Point. The district was granted borough status in 1992.

Governance

Elections to the borough council are held in three out of every four years, with one-third of the 41 seats on the council being elected at each election. The Conservative and Labour parties have both had majorities on the council, with Labour running it from 1973 to 1976 and 1995 to 2003, while the Conservatives have run it between 1976 and 1995, and since the 2003 election. The Conservatives lost their majority at the 2014 election but regained it in November 2014 after a defection. In 2022, the Conservatives lost control of the council, and the administration is made up of the Canvey Island Independent Party and People's Independent Party. As of 2022, the composition is as follows:

Twinning

Castle Point is twinned with three towns and counties:
 Romainville, a north-eastern Paris suburb, since 30 March 1962.
 Cologne District, Germany. Formally since 19 June 1971 when Lövenich (now part of Cologne) was an independent town.
 County Roscommon, Republic of Ireland. Twinned with Castle Point council in April 1998.

Places of interest

Hadleigh Castle is preserved as an ancient monument from the 13th century, forming the most important historic site in the borough and the most important late medieval castle in Essex. The Dutch Cottage Museum contains a variety of exhibits that illustrate the history of Canvey Island, and the Castle Point Transport Museum, also situated on Canvey in the retired District bus depot, features a display of over thirty old buses, coaches and commercial vehicles.

Transport
The A13 crosses Castle Point and the A127 skirts it to the north, providing direct links to both Southend and London. The M25 is 20 minutes drive away.

Frequent train services run through Benfleet station on the London Fenchurch Street to Shoeburyness line, operated by c2c In September 2007, The station had a £115,000 improvement programme to make the station more accessible for people with disabilities and those using pushchairs.

Southend Airport is a few miles from the border of Castle Point and currently offers private flights. It is now London's fifth international airport, owned by Eddie Stobart, which now includes a new control tower, terminal building and hotel. It is currently in the process of extending the passenger services available from the airport.

Stansted is the third busiest airport in the UK and serves 160 destinations across 34 countries.

Castle Point has an extensive bus network operated by the First Essex and Arriva Shires & Essex, with services across the borough and to Southend, Basildon, Lakeside Shopping Centre and Rayleigh. Weekday services by Stephensons of Essex also travel to London, Southend and Thurrock College and Regal Busways offers a six-day-a-week service to Chelmsford.

Sport and community facilities
Waterside Farm Sports Centre, on Canvey Island, is one of the most comprehensive centres in Essex. It has a 25-metre swimming pool, a learner pool and facilities for badminton, squash, netball, basketball, trampolining and gymnastics. The centre also includes an outdoor 6 lane, 400 m Athletics track.

Opposite the Sports Centre is the Castle Point Golf Course, an 18-hole par 71 public pay-and-play course with a 17-bay floodlit driving range. The course is open seven days a week during daylight hours, 364 days a year. There is a PGA-qualified professional on site offering lessons for all abilities, both individually and as a group.

Runnymede Pool is situated behind the Council Offices in Kiln Road, South Benfleet. There is a 25-metre pool and a learner pool. It is also home to Runnymede Swimming Club. The club is extremely popular and offers competitive swimming for children as young as 7 through to masters level. It also has an excellent swim ability squad and recently started a disability water polo squad. The club also holds asa accredited Swim 21 status.

Regeneration
Castle Point forms part of the Thames Gateway, making it the focus for regeneration projects. Castle Point Borough Council has been working with other key local agencies through the Castle Point Regeneration Partnership to look at long-term improvements to the borough.

The first phase of improvements focuses on Canvey seafront. Investment here is designed to make the area more attractive for residents and visitors and also to encourage additional business investment.

Other regeneration projects in Castle Point have included:

 £350,000 from EEDA, enabling Castle Point Borough Council to create Canvey Heights Country Park from a former landfill site.
 The RSPB purchase of land at West Canvey Marsh to create a nature reserve
 The revamp of Thorney Bay, Canvey, by Castle Point Borough Council's street scene partner Pinnacle

The partnership brings together all local organisations working to improve Castle Point through long term regeneration. It includes Castle Point Borough Council, Essex County Council, East of England Development Agency (EEDA), Thames Gateway South Essex Partnership, the Greengrid partnership, the RSPB and many more. They work together to make local improvements in a co-ordinated way and champion the area's interests regionally and nationally.

The partnership has also been:

 Studying ways to support existing businesses at Charfleets Industrial Estate
 Looking at ways to create additional employment
 Consulting about improvements to Canvey Town Centre with a view to making it the heart of the community and to encourage local shopping
 Researching opportunities for the Paddocks area, so it supports the town centre and offers greater community provision.
 Working closely with Essex County Council for improvements to the traffic capacity on the A13 to relieve congestion on Canvey Island.
 Carrying out a study into how Hadleigh Town Centre can be made a more attractive community shopping area

There are long-term plans for improvements to Manor Trading Estate in Thundersley and the Benfleet and Thundersley shopping centres.

Additionally private developers have announced a new retail park to be built next to Morrisons supermarket at Roscommon Way on Canvey Island which will be due to open in 2018.

Culture

Castle Point's biggest event of the year is the Castle Point Show – held at Waterside Farm Showground on the last Sunday in July, the show attracts thousands of people each year.

The annual firework fiesta, held on the nearest Friday to 5 November, is also a popular event for residents and visitors from further afield.

Each year the Mayor of Castle Point holds a carol service at Runnymede Hall, Thundersley. Open to the public, this event is free to attend and is supported by the Salvation Army band and songsters.

Now an annual event is The Noise Arts Festival, which was established in 2011 and takes place during the October half term, it is a mixture of comedy, music, workshops, and art across a number of venues mainly in the Thundersley area.

Demography
The median age of Castle Point's residents at the 2011 census was 45, compared to a regional average of 39 and national average of 40.

The national land use survey carried out for the following census in 2005 by the Office for National Statistics showed  over 50% of the borough to be within its non-gardens definition of green space: here a mixture of agricultural fields, natural marshland and sports grounds and to have the second lowest area in England covered by non-domestic buildings: .  More than one fifth of the area, was made up by the second-highest category of use: gardens.  The district ranked 295th in area of the 325 districts in England in area.  The district relies heavily on other parts of Essex including factories and ports in Tilbury, the City of Southend on Sea and on Central London for its major centres of employment.

Castle Point has several estates laid out as seaside resorts for retirement, as a result 7% of its population at the time of the 2011 census were aged 75 to 84, compared to 5.5% nationally.

Geography

Climate
Climate in this area has mild differences between highs and lows, but despite adequate rainfall all year-round it is on average the driest part of the UK.  The Köppen Climate Classification subtype for this climate is "Cfb" (Marine West Coast Climate/Oceanic climate).

Places in Castle Point district
Canvey Island
Daws Heath
Dutch Village
Hadleigh
Hope's Green
Leigh Beck
New Thundersley
South Benfleet
Sunken Marsh
Tarpots
Thundersley
Winter Gardens

Arms

References

External links
 Castle Point Borough Council Home Page

 
Non-metropolitan districts of Essex
Boroughs in England